Jules Février (1842 in Membrey – 23 January 1937 in Paris) was a French architect. His notable works included the Gran Vía in Madrid, on which he collaborated with his son Raymond, also an architect. Another son, Henry Février, was a composer.

External links
http://paris1900.lartnouveau.com/paris17/lieux/l_hotel_gaillard.htm

1842 births
1937 deaths
People from Haute-Saône
19th-century French architects
20th-century French architects
Burials at Père Lachaise Cemetery
Chevaliers of the Légion d'honneur